This is a list of school districts in Ontario.

There are 76 public school boards in Ontario, including 38 public secular boards (34 English boards and 4
French boards (ACÉPO)), 38 public separate boards (29 English Catholic boards, 8 French Catholic boards and 1 English Protestant board), and 7 public school authorities that operate in children's treatment centres.

School boards

Former school districts
There were a number of schools governed by "school authorities," which managed schools in remote and sparsely populated regions.  Effective September 1, 2009, 20 isolated school authorities were amalgamated with district school boards.

Airy & Sabine District School Authority - merged with Renfrew County DSB
Atikokan Roman Catholic Separate School Board, Atikokan - merged with Northwest CDSB
Asquith-Garvey District School Authority, Shining Tree - merged with Rainbow DSB
Caramat District School Area Board, Caramat - merged with Superior-Greenstone DSB
Collins District School Area Board, Collins - merged with Lakehead DSB
Connell and Ponsford District School Area Board, Pickle Lake - merged with Keewatin-Patricia DSB
Conseil des écoles séparées catholiques de Dubreuilville, Dubreuilville - merged with CSDC du Nouvel-Ontario
Conseil des écoles séparées catholiques de Foleyet, Foleyet - merged with CSDC des Grandes Rivières
Foleyet District School Area Board, Foleyet - merged with DSB Ontario North East
Foleyet Roman Catholic Separate School Board, Foleyet - merged with CSDC des Grandes Rivières
Gogama District School Area Board, Gogama - merged with DSB Ontario North East
Gogama Roman Catholic Separate School Board, Gogama
Hornepayne Roman Catholic Separate School Board, Hornepayne - merged with Huron-Superior DSB and CDSC du Nouvel-Ontario
Ignace Roman Catholic Separate School Board, Ignace- merged with CSDC des Aurores boréales
Mine Centre District School Area Board, Mine Centre - merged with Rainy River DSB
Missarenda District School Area Board, Missanabie - merged with Algoma DSB
Moosonee Roman Catholic Separate School Board, Moosonee - merged with Northeastern CDSB and CDSC des Grande Rivières
Murchison and Lyell District School Area Board, Madawaska - merged with Renfrew County DSB
Nakina District School Area Board, Nakina - merged with Superior-Greenstone DSB
Northern District School Area Board, Armstrong and Savant Lake - merged with Lakehead DSB and Keewatin-Patricia DSB
Parry Sound Roman Catholic Separate School Board, Parry Sound - merged with Simcoe-Muskoka CDSB
Red Lake Area Combined Roman Catholic Separate School Board, Red Lake - merged with Kenora Catholic DSB and CSDC des Aurores boréales
Upsala District School Area Board, Upsala - merged with Keewatin-Patricia DSB

Prior to 1998, Ontario had 124 school districts within the province including the list above

Conseil des écoles françaises de la communauté urbaine de Toronto - merged into Conseil Scolaire de District du Centre-Sud-Ouest
Conseil de la ville de Hamilton  - merged into Conseil Scolaire de District du Centre-Sud-Ouest
East York Board of Education - merged with the Toronto District School Board
Etobicoke Board of Education - merged with the Toronto District School Board
Metropolitan Separate School Board - split into the Toronto Catholic District School Board and Conseil scolaire de district catholique Centre-Sud
North York Board of Education - merged with the Toronto District School Board
Scarborough Board of Education - merged with the Toronto District School Board
Toronto Board of Education - merged with the Toronto District School Board
Board of Education for the City of York - merged with the Toronto District School Board
York Region Roman Catholic Separate School Board - split into the York Catholic District School Board and Conseil scolaire de district catholique Centre-Sud

School sections

From 1846 to the late 1800s schools were assigned to school districts or School Sections. Instead of names for each school, they were assigned numbers, e.g. SS No 11.

See also
List of high schools in Ontario
Education in Ontario

References

External links
Ontario Ministry of Education Quick Facts
Ontario Ministry of Education - Find a School Board
Facts about School Districts in Ontario

 
School boards
Ontario school districts